Mount Jewell is a mountain  south of Mount Cordwell and  south-southwest of Stor Hanakken Mountain in Enderby Land, Antarctica. It was plotted from air photos taken from Australian National Antarctic Research Expeditions aircraft in 1957, and was named by the Antarctic Names Committee of Australia for F. Jewell, a geophysicist at Wilkes Station in 1961.

References

External links

Mountains of Enderby Land